Jorge Martín Almoguera (born 29 January 1998), nicknamed the Martinator, is a Spanish Grand Prix motorcycle racer riding for Pramac Racing. In 2021 Martín moved up to the premier class with Pramac Racing, and won the 2021 Styrian motorcycle Grand Prix, as well as securing three pole positions in his first seven entries, four total in his rookie campaign. He is best known for winning the 2018 Moto3 World Championship with Gresini Racing, and was also the 2014 Red Bull MotoGP Rookies Cup champion.

Career

Moto3 World Championship

Mapfre Team Mahindra (2015)
In 2015, Martín made his full-time Grand Prix debut in the Moto3 World Championship with Mapfre Team Mahindra, riding a Mahindra alongside Francesco Bagnaia and Juanfran Guevara. His best result was a 7th place in Aragon, and managed to score 45 points in his rookie season.

Pull & Bear Aspar Mahindra Team (2016)
Martín remained with the same team for the 2016 Moto3 World Championship. His first-ever Grand Prix podium came in the rain-affected Czech Grand Prix, where he finished second. He closed the season 16th in the standings, scoring 72 points.

Del Conca Gresini Moto3 (2017–2018)

In 2017 Martín moved to the Del Conca Gresini Racing team. His teammate was Fabio Di Giannantonio. He started the season red hot, finishing on the podium the first three races, two third places in Qatar and Argentina, and a second place in the USA. In the middle of the year, Martín grabbed three more 3rd places in Barcelona, Asturia, and Silverstone, before finishing the season as he started it. In the three last races, he finished third in Australia, second in Malaysia, and achieved his first victory of the category in the last race at Valencia. Martín had nine pole positions throughout the year (Qatar, France, Italy, Barcelona, Holland, Aragon, Australia, and Valencia), gaining the reputation for being one of the fastest qualifiers in the MotoGP paddock. Martín ended the season in 4th place with 196 points, despite being forced to miss the Czech Grand Prix at Brno circuit, due to an injury sustained in the previous round.

In 2018, Martín became the world champion in the Moto3 class. He had seven wins (Qatar, America, Italy, The Netherlands, Germany, Aragon, and Malaysia), two second places in San Marino and Valencia, a third place in Austria, and continued his brilliant Saturday performances, with eleven pole positions. He earned 260 championship points, 42 more than teammate Fabio Di Giannantonio, who finished runner-up in the championship. Oddly enough, Martín was again forced to miss the Czech Grand Prix, due to a fracture of the left radius, remedied in free practice.

Moto2 World Championship

Red Bull KTM Ajo (2019–2020)
As champion, Martín moved up a category for the 2019 Moto2 World Championship, riding for the Red Bull KTM Ajo Motorsport team. He collected a third place in Japan, and a second place in Australia, ending the season in 11th place with 94 points.

2020
In 2020 Martín remained with the Ajo outfit, but the team switched to riding a Kalex. He started the season well, getting pole position and third place in Jerez. He then won his first Moto2 race in the Austrian Grand Prix, before finishing in second place in the next weekend's Styrian Grand Prix. On the 10th of September 2020, he announced that he was positive to covid-19, which forced him to skip the two following rounds in Rimini and Misano. Martín recovered well, and ended the season with a third place in Aragón, a second place in the first Valencian race, and a victory in the second race in Valencia. He ended the season with six podiums, evenly distributed 2-2-2 each for every step of the podium, one pole position, and 160 points, enough for 5th in the championship standings.

MotoGP World Championship

Pramac Racing (2021–present)

2021 

Martín joined the premier class with Pramac Racing Ducati, alongside Johann Zarco who moved from Esponsorama, for the 2021 season. Martín started with finishing 15th in his first race of the premier class, then scored a pole position in the second round of the year in Qatar, finishing the race in 3rd place, and scoring his first MotoGP podium. Unfortunately he had a serious accident during the practice before the 2021 Portuguese Grand Prix, and was forced to miss the Portuguese, Spanish, French and Italian races, being replaced for the first two rounds by Tito Rabat, and the latter two by Michele Pirro. Martín was originally meant to return for the Italian Grand Prix, but due to advise by doctors he forwent the race. He made a full return in the Catalan Grand Prix, finishing 14th, before a 12th place finish at the German Grand Prix, and a retirement at the Dutch GP, after he was having physical issues with his biceps and also having tendinitis. At the Styrian GP, Martín took his second pole position, and following a red flag incident, he took his maiden MotoGP win in the re-started race. With this victory, he earned Pramac Racing’s first ever MotoGP victory, and became just the third rider in the modern 1000cc era, to win a race in his rookie season, after Marc Márquez in 2013, and Brad Binder in 2020. The very next weekend, he grabbed his third pole position of the season in Austria, and his third podium too, finishing the race in third. In the season closer at Valencia, Martín scored his fourth pole position, and his fourth podium, finishing the race in second place. When on pole position, he never finished off the podium, collecting 111 points, enough for 9th in the championship, and won rookie of the year by 9 points over Enea Bastianini.

2022 
Martín and Zarco remained with Pramac Racing for the 2022 MotoGP season. At the 2022 Australian motorcycle Grand Prix, Martín took pole, and broke the all-time lap at the Phillip Island Grand Prix Circuit.

2023 
Pramac Racing retained Martín and Zarco for the 2023 MotoGP World Championship.

Career statistics

Red Bull MotoGP Rookies Cup

Races by year
(key) (Races in bold indicate pole position, races in italics indicate fastest lap)

FIM CEV Moto3 Junior World Championship

Races by year
(key) (Races in bold indicate pole position, races in italics indicate fastest lap)

Grand Prix motorcycle racing

By season

By class

Races by year
(key) (Races in bold indicate pole position, races in italics indicate fastest lap)

References

External links

1998 births
Living people
Spanish motorcycle racers
Moto3 World Championship riders
Sportspeople from Madrid
Moto2 World Championship riders
MotoGP World Championship riders
Pramac Racing MotoGP riders
Moto3 World Riders' Champions